Ethel is an unincorporated community located along U.S. Route 12 in east Lewis County, Washington, United States.  It sits between Mary's Corner and Salkum.

History

A post office called Ethel has been in operation since 1886. The town's moniker was intended to be "Lacamas", after a creek that flowed through the town, however the Postmaster General at the time, William F. Vilas, declared that too many towns in Washington state were named after Native tribes, and choose Ethel, without an explanation. The reason and origins for the Ethel name, despite several theories, remains obscure.

Ethel's early economy was derived by the logging of old growth timber and farming. Education was provided at the Hopewell School, a one-room schoolhouse featuring eight different grade levels. The school would become the location for the Ethel Grange Hall. The town also formed teams to participate in Grange League baseball.

Government and politics

Politics

Ethel is recognized as being majority Republican and conservative.

The results for the 2020 U.S. Presidential Election for the Ethel voting district were as follows:

 Donald J. Trump (Republican) - 654 (71.71%)
 Joe Biden (Democrat) - 232 (25.44%)
 Jo Jorgensen (Libertarian) - 15 (1.64%)
 Howie Hawkins (Green) - 4 (0.44%)
 Other candidates - 2 (0.22%)
 Write-in candidate - 5 (0.55%)

References

Populated places in Lewis County, Washington
Unincorporated communities in Lewis County, Washington
Unincorporated communities in Washington (state)